Rein Miller (2 August 1938, Tallinn – 10 April 2017, Tallinn) was an Estonian banker, financial figure, politician and sports figure.

In 1992, he was Minister of Finance. From 1976 until 1999, he was President of the Estonian Ice Hockey Federation.

References

1938 births
2017 deaths
Estonian bankers
Finance ministers of Estonia
University of Tartu alumni
Sportspeople from Tallinn
People from Tallinn
Burials at Pärnamäe Cemetery